Petrit Frrokaj (born 16 January 1985) is a Swiss footballer of Albanian descent. He plays for BSC Old Boys.

External links

Swiss men's footballers
Association football midfielders
Swiss people of Albanian descent
1985 births
Living people
FC Baden players
FC Locarno players
BSC Old Boys players